Nicholas More (fl. 1390–1397) of Wells, Somerset, was an English politician.

He was a Member (MP) of the Parliament of England for Wells in January 1390 and January 1397.

References

14th-century births
Year of death missing
English MPs January 1390
Politicians from Somerset
English MPs January 1397